South Ribble is a borough in the county of Lancashire, England. Its council is based in Leyland. The population, at the 2011 Census, was 109,057. Notable towns and villages include Walton le Dale, Bamber Bridge, Leyland and Penwortham. It is wedged geographically between the towns of Blackburn, Lytham St Annes and Chorley and the city of Preston.

Overview

The district was formed on 1 April 1974 under the Local Government Act 1972, from Leyland and Walton-le-Dale urban districts, along with part of Preston Rural District.

The Parliamentary Constituency of South Ribble includes the West Lancashire communities of Rufford, Tarleton, Hesketh Bank and Meols.
Other notable population areas within South Ribble are Penwortham, Longton, Hutton, Walton-le-Dale, Bamber Bridge, Lostock Hall, Moss Side, and part of Buckshaw Village.

Council

In the 2007 local elections, South Ribble Conservative party won a landslide victory, gaining 24 seats to hold 44 of 55 on the borough council.

After the 2015 local elections, the political make up was Conservative (29 members), Labour (19 members) and Liberal Democrat (2 members).

In the 2019 local elections the Conservatives lost their majority and Labour took control after an agreement with the Liberal Democrats. The current make up of the council is Conservatives (23 members), Labour (22 members), Liberal Democrat (5 members).

Premises
The council is based at the Civic Centre on West Paddock in Leyland.

Parishes

The former urban district areas of Leyland, Lostock Hall, Bamber Bridge and Walton-le-Dale are unparished areas.  The rest of the district is divided into the following civil parishes:

 Cuerdale
 Farington
 Hutton
 Little Hoole
 Longton
 Much Hoole
 Penwortham (town)
 Samlesbury

Twin Town 
South Ribble is twinned with:
  Schleswig-Flensburg, Germany

Freedom of the Borough
The following people and military units have received the Freedom of the Borough of South Ribble.

Individuals
 Anthony Kelly : September 2010.

Military Units
 The King's Royal Hussars: 1992.

Footnotes

External links
South Ribble Borough Council
South Ribble Neighbourhood Watch Association
Leyland Lancashire - A Community website

 
Non-metropolitan districts of Lancashire
Boroughs in England